Xavier Barios is an Andorran paralympic skier.

Career
Barios has competed in two Paralympic Games. First, in 2002, where he competed in the LW10 class giant slalom and slalom, failing to finish either event. He returned four years later in Turin for the 2006 edition, where he competed in the seated skiing events. However, he again failed to finish in the slalom, but picked up a 40th place in the giant slalom.

References

 

Andorran male alpine skiers
Alpine skiers at the 2002 Winter Paralympics
Alpine skiers at the 2006 Winter Paralympics
Paralympic alpine skiers of Andorra
Living people
Year of birth missing (living people)